Dick Cowman is a former rugby union international who represented England from 1971 to 1973.

Early life
Dick Cowman was born on 18 March 1949 in Workington.

Rugby union career
Cowman made his international debut on 20 Mar 1971 at Twickenham in the England vs Scotland match.
Of the 5 matches he played for his national side he was never on the winning side.
He played his final match for England on 10 February 1973 at Lansdowne Road in the Ireland vs England match.

References

1949 births
Living people
Alumni of Loughborough University
England international rugby union players
English rugby union players
Loughborough Students RUFC players
Rugby union fly-halves
Rugby union players from Workington